Linthwaite (known as Linfit in the local community) is a village in Kirklees, West Yorkshire, England. The village together with Blackmoorfoot had a population of 3,835 according to the 2001 census.

The River Colne, Huddersfield Narrow Canal, the Huddersfield to Manchester railway line and A62 main road all pass near to the village. After they were constructed, textile mills were then built to produce cloth making use of the river. This led to the growth of the village. Linthwaite Hall on Linfit Fold was built around 1600.

Currently, it is a busy village with five pubs, including the Sair Inn, a traditional pub, formerly known as the 'New Inn'  and now one of the few 'own brew' pubs still in the country. It won the CAMRA National Pub of the Year Award in 1997.
 
Linthwaite is believed to be given where the surname Dyson started in 1316.

Blackmoorfoot Reservoir, at the top of Gilroyd Lane, is a wintering site for migrating wildfowl and wading birds.

Education
There are two primary schools and a secondary in the village: Linthwaite Ardron Memorial Junior School and the Linthwaite Clough Junior Infant and Early Years School for local children; and Colne Valley High School, whose catchment area is described in the name.

Sport
In sport the village has two teams in the Huddersfield District Cricket League: Broad Oak (on the top road) and Linthwaite (in the valley).

Linthwaite also has football teams playing in the RCD Junior Football League from under-8s right up to under-18s. They also have a football group of 5-to-7 year olds.

Industry
The largest employer in the village is pharmaceutical drug manufacturer Thornton & Ross, the producer of Covonia cough medicine. The company, which was founded by Nathan Thornton and Phillip Ross in 1922, was acquired by STADA Arzneimittel in a £221 million deal in August 2013.

See also
Listed buildings in Colne Valley (eastern area)

References

External links

 Linthwaite Leadboilers

Villages in West Yorkshire
Towns and villages of the Peak District
Geography of Huddersfield
Colne Valley